The Haw River Town Museum is a museum located in  Haw River, North Carolina. Housed in a 145-year-old building which once served as the town's fire hall, the museum exhibits photographs, artifacts and memorabilia, focusing on the town's history.

References

Museums in Alamance County, North Carolina
History museums in North Carolina